Khan Academy is an American non-profit educational organization created in 2008 by Sal Khan. Its goal is creating a set of online tools that help educate students. The organization produces short lessons in the form of videos. Its website also includes supplementary practice exercises and materials for educators. It has produced over 8,000 video lessons teaching a wide spectrum of academic subjects, originally focusing on mathematics and sciences. All resources are available for free to users of the website and application.

, over 70 million people use Khan Academy, out of which 2.3 million students use it to prepare for the SAT. As of February 2023, the Khan Academy channel on YouTube has 7.74 million subscribers and Khan Academy videos have been viewed over 2 billion times.

History 

Starting in 2004, Salman "Sal" Khan began tutoring one of his cousins in mathematics on the Internet using a service called Yahoo! Doodle Images. After a while, Khan's other cousins began to use his tutoring service. Due to the demand, Khan decided to make his videos watchable on the Internet, so he published his content on YouTube. Later, he used a drawing application called SmoothDraw, and now uses a Wacom tablet to draw using ArtRage. The video tutorials were recorded on his computer.

Positive responses prompted Khan to incorporate Khan Academy in 2008 and quit his job the same year to focus full-time on creating educational tutorials (then released under the name Khan Academy) while reading Gannett newspaper USA Today. Khan Lab School, a school founded by Sal Khan and associated with Khan Academy, opened on September 15, 2014, in Mountain View, California. In June 2017, Khan Academy officially launched the Financial Literacy Video Series for college graduates, jobseekers and young professionals.

Funding 
Khan Academy is a 501(c)(3) nonprofit organization, mostly funded by donations coming from philanthropic organizations. On its IRS form 990, the organization reported $31 million in revenues in 2018 and $28 million in 2019, including $839,000 in 2019 compensation for Khan as CEO.

In 2010, Google donated $2 million for creating new courses and translating content into other languages, as part of their Project 10100 program.  In 2013, Carlos Slim from the Luis Alcazar Foundation in Mexico, made a donation for creating Spanish versions of videos. In 2015, AT&T contributed $2.25 million to Khan Academy for mobile versions of the content accessible through apps.  The Bill & Melinda Gates Foundation has donated $1.5 million to Khan Academy. On January 11, 2021, Elon Musk donated $5 million through his Musk foundation.

Content 
Khan Academy's website aims to provide a free personalized learning experience, that are built on the videos, hosted on YouTube. The website is meant to be used as a supplement to its videos, because it includes other features such as progress tracking, practice exercises, and teaching tools. The material can also be accessed through mobile applications. The videos enable students to acquire knowledge at their own learning speed according to the concept of mastery learning. They are therefore used by teachers to teach according to the principle of Flipped Classroom. 

The videos display a recording of drawings on an electronic blackboard, which are similar to the style of a teacher giving a lecture. The narrator describes each drawing and how they relate to the material being taught. Furthermore, throughout the lessons, users can earn badges and energy points, which can be displayed on their profiles. Non-profit groups have distributed offline versions of the videos to rural areas in Asia, Latin America, and Africa.  Videos range from all subjects covered in school and for all grades from kindergarten up through high school. The Khan Academy website also hosts content from educational YouTube channels and organizations such as Crash Course and the Museum of Modern Art. It also provides online courses for preparing for standardized tests, including the SAT, AP Chemistry, Praxis Core and MCAT and released LSAT preparation lessons in 2018. They also have a collaboration with independent chemists, which are mentioned in their, "Meet the chemistry professional". Khan Academy has also supported Code.org’s Hour of Code, providing coding lessons on its website.

In July 2017, Khan Academy became the official practice partner for the College Board's Advanced Placement.

Language availability 
Khan Academy videos have been translated into several languages, with close to 20,000 subtitle translations available. These translations are mainly volunteer-driven with help from international partnerships. The Khan Academy platform is fully available in English (en), Bangla (bn), Bulgarian (bg), Chinese (zh), French (fr), German (de), Georgian (ka), Norwegian (nb), Polish (pl) Portuguese (pt), Spanish (es), Serbian (sr), Turkish (tr) and Uzbek (uz), and partially available in 28 other languages.

Official SAT preparation 
Since 2015, Khan Academy has been the official SAT preparation website. According to reports, studying for the SAT for 20 hours at Khan Academy is associated with a 115-point average score increase. Many book exercises select questions from the Khan Academy site to be published.

Pixar in a Box 
In 2015, Khan Academy teamed up with Pixar to create a new course named Pixar in a Box, which teaches how skills learned in school help the creators at Pixar.

Official Test Preparation 
Khan Academy also provides free test preps for SAT, LSAT, and MCAT.

Khan Academy Kids 
In 2018, Khan Academy created an application called Khan Academy Kids. It is used by two to six-year-old children to learn basic skills (primarily mathematics and language arts) before progressing to grade school.

Teachers 
Teachers can set up a classroom within Khan Academy. This classroom allows teachers to assign courses within Khan Academy's database to their students. Teachers can also track their student's progress as they work through the assigned tutorials.

Criticism 
Khan Academy has been criticized because its creator, Sal Khan, lacks a formal background or qualifications in pedagogy. Statements made in certain mathematics and physics videos have been questioned for their technical accuracy. In response to these criticisms, the organization has corrected errors in its videos, expanded its faculty, and formed a network of over 200 content experts.

In an interview from January 2016, Khan defended the value of Khan Academy online lectures while acknowledging their limitations: "I think they're valuable, but I'd never say they somehow constitute a complete education." Khan Academy positions itself as a supplement to in-class learning, with the ability to improve the effectiveness of teachers by freeing them from traditional lectures and giving them more time to tend to individual students' needs.

Recognition 
Khan Academy has gained recognition both in the US and internationally:

 In April 2012, Khan was listed among TIME's 100 Most Influential People for 2012.
 In 2012, Khan Academy won a Webby Award in the category Websites and Mobile Sites, Education.
 Khan was one of five winners of the 2013 Heinz Award. His award was in the area of "Human Condition."
 In 2016, Khan Academy won a Shorty Award for Best in Education.
 In 2016, Khan received the fourth-highest civilian award of the Republic of India, the Padma Shri, from the President of India

References

External links 

 

2008 establishments in California
501(c)(3) organizations
Charities based in California
American educational websites
Articles containing video clips
Educational organizations based in the United States
Education companies established in 2008
Educational technology non-profits
Education-related YouTube channels
Science-related YouTube channels
Mountain View, California
Online nonprofit organizations
Open educational resources
Organizations established in 2008
Online tutoring
Shorty Award winners